Urgrund may refer to:
 Absolute (philosophy), the concept of the most real being, the fundamental reality
 Urgrund (comics), an ancient planet in the Fourth World storyline of DC superhero comics